The John Ownby Cabin is a historic cabin in Sevier County, Tennessee, United States.  Located in The Sugarlands, it lies within the boundaries of the Great Smoky Mountains National Park.  It was built in 1860, and is the last surviving structure from the pre-park Forks-of-the-River community.  Repairs were carried out on the dilapidated cabin in 1964, which included replacing the front porch, and the cabin was added to the National Register of Historic Places in 1976.  The cabin currently stands along the Fighting Creek Nature Trail, an interpretive trail accessible behind the Sugarlands Visitor Center.

The walls are built of hewn white pine and poplar logs with dove-tail notching. The cabin's interior contains a sawn board floor, and lacks a loft. The  porch consists of sawn boards over a hewn log sill. The cabin's gabled roof is covered with split oak shingles, and the roof of the porch, which is slightly lower than the cabin roof, is supported by hardwood posts. The cabin has two board and batten doors and two windows, and a chimney constructed of rubble and red clay.

References

National Register of Historic Places in Great Smoky Mountains National Park
Houses completed in 1860
Houses in Sevier County, Tennessee
Houses on the National Register of Historic Places in Tennessee
Log cabins in the United States
National Register of Historic Places in Sevier County, Tennessee
Log buildings and structures on the National Register of Historic Places in Tennessee
1860 establishments in Tennessee